Palazzo pants (Indian English: pantada) are long unisex pants cut with a loose, extremely wide leg that flares out from the waist.

Palazzo pants are popular as a summer season style, as they are loose and tend to be flattering in light, flowing fabrics that are breathable in hot weather. Silk crepe/crape, jersey, and other natural fibre textiles are popular fabrics for this design. Palazzo pants are less frequently seen during the winter months, but they may be found in wool or heavy synthetic fabrics as well.

History
Palazzo pants for women first became a popular trend in the late 1960s and early 1970s. The style was reminiscent of the wide-legged cuffed pants worn by some women fond of avant-garde fashions in the 1930s and 1940s, particularly actresses such as Katharine Hepburn, Greta Garbo and Marlene Dietrich. During the 1960s, some upscale restaurants resisted modern fashion trends by refusing to admit women wearing pants, which were considered inappropriate by some proprietors. This posed a problem for women who did not want to wear the skirt styles that were then in fashion. Some women opted to circumvent restaurant bans on women in pants by wearing palazzo pants or culottes as evening wear.

Palazzo pants flare out evenly from the waist to the ankle, and are therefore different from bell-bottoms, which are snug until they flare out from the knee. Palazzo pants are also not to be confused with Gaucho trousers, which only extend down to mid-calf length. Harem pants are yet another loose style, but they have a snug cuff around the ankles.

References

1960s fashion
Trousers and shorts